Fork in the Road is the debut studio album by The Infamous Stringdusters released on Sugar Hill Records. The title track won Song of the Year at the 2007 International Bluegrass Music Awards. The album also won the Album of the Year at the 2007 International Bluegrass Music Awards.

Track listing

Personnel 
Tim Stafford - Producer
Randy LeRoy - Mastering
Patrick Murphy, Dave Sinko, & Tony Smith- Engineers
Geoff Bartley, Johnny Cobb, Benny Galloway, Glen Garrett, & John Pennell - Composers
Alan Bartram - Bass, Producer
Travis Book - Bass, Vocals, Producer
Jesse Cobb - Mandolin, Producer
Jeremy Garrett - Fiddle, Vocals, Producer, Composer
Andy Hall - Dobro, Vocals, Producer, Composer

References

The Infamous Stringdusters albums
Country albums by American artists
Sugar Hill Records albums
2007 debut albums